The 2009 French Open was a tennis tournament played on outdoor clay courts. It was the 113th edition of the French Open, and the second Grand Slam event of the year. It took place at the Stade Roland Garros in Paris, France, from May 24 through June 7, 2009.

Rafael Nadal and Ana Ivanovic were the defending champions. Both failed to defend their titles, losing to Robin Söderling and Victoria Azarenka in the fourth round, respectively. Nadal's loss to Söderling was his first defeat in the tournament since debuting in 2005, and would remain his sole loss at the tournament until the 2015 French Open. Söderling proceeded to defeat Nikolay Davydenko and Fernando González on his way to the final, where he was defeated by Roger Federer. By winning the French Open, Federer equalled Pete Sampras' then-record of 14 Grand Slam titles, and completed his Career Grand Slam by winning the tournament; he had lost the previous three finals to Nadal. Svetlana Kuznetsova, the runner-up to Justine Henin-Hardenne in 2006, was the women's champion this year. She defeated World No. 1 Dinara Safina in the final, avenging a semi-final loss to the same opponent in 2008.

Notable stories

Rafael Nadal record winning streak, and loss to Robin Söderling
Entering the tournament, four-time champion Rafael Nadal was unbeaten in French Open singles matches, having won every match and tournament since his debut in 2005. His victory against Russian Teymuraz Gabashvili in the second round on May 27 was his 30th consecutive win, breaking the record for the longest French Open winning streak by a man or woman, held by Chris Evert, who won 29 consecutive matches. Nadal extended the record to 31 consecutive matches by beating Lleyton Hewitt on May 29.

In his fourth round match on May 31, Nadal was defeated by World No. 23 Robin Söderling in four sets, 2–6, 7–6, 4–6, 6–7. The upset result ended Nadal's French Open winning streak at 31 matches. Söderling had never previously reached the fourth round of any Grand Slam tournament, and had never previously beaten Nadal in three attempts, although he had taken him to five sets at Wimbledon in 2007. Söderling proceeded to reach the final, defeating Nikolay Davydenko in straight sets and Fernando González in five sets before losing to Roger Federer in his first Grand Slam final appearance.

Of the upset result, former three-time French Open champion Mats Wilander stated that "Everybody's in a state of shock, I would think. At some point, Nadal was going to lose. But nobody expected it to happen today, and maybe not this year. Now it's a matter of: There's a tournament to be won." Nadal would begin another streak the next year, and did not lose another match at the tournament until the 2015 French Open, when he lost to Novak Djokovic.

Maria Sharapova's comeback

After nearly a year out of the sport due to a serious shoulder injury which forced her to miss the 2008 Beijing Olympics, the 2008 US Open and her Australian Open title defence, Maria Sharapova, who started at World No. 53 by the time the entry list was released, then plummeted to as low as World No. 126 during her time away from the sport, entered the tournament ranked World No. 102 at the start of the tournament, and surprised many by reaching the quarter-finals, where she was defeated 6–0, 6–2 by Dominika Cibulková (Sharapova had to defend a match point at 0–6, 0–5 down). Sharapova, unseeded at a Grand Slam for the first time since 2003, had won all of her first four matches in three sets.

Federer's Career Grand Slam
Roger Federer won the finals, against Robin Söderling to finally win the French Open tournament for the first time in his career, after he was beaten in three previous finals by Nadal. With this win, he completed his career Grand Slam, titles in all four Grand Slam tournaments in his career. He became the third male player in the Open era (after Rod Laver and Andre Agassi) and sixth male player in tennis history overall to accomplish the feat.

Singles players
Men's singles

Women's singles

Day-by-day summaries

Day 1 (May 24)
Andrey Golubev of Kazakhstan became the first male winner at this year's French Open. French favourites Julie Coin and Mathieu Montcourt enjoyed safe passages through to the second round, but compatriot Mathilde Johansson was unable to use the crowd's advantage, falling to Vitalia Diatchenko 2–6, 6–2, 10–8. Lleyton Hewitt came from 2 tiebreak sets down, taking a third set tiebreak and eventually the match over the 26th seeded Croat Ivo Karlović, winning 6–7(1), 6–7(4), 7–6(4), 6–4, 6–3, to cause the first upset of a seed in the tournament. Karlovic set the new record for the greatest number of aces in the match, serving 55, but couldn't find a way to win. French wildcard Josselin Ouanna came from two sets to one behind to defeat Marcel Granollers, 7–5, 2–6, 3–6, 7–6(2), 6–1. However, Amélie Mauresmo lost to Anna-Lena Grönefeld 6–4, 6–3, to add to her history of early-round exits at Roland Garros. However, seventh seed Gilles Simon recovered from a tight clash with Wayne Odesnik, 4–6, 7–5, 6–2, 4–6, 6–3. Former French Open champion Gastón Gaudio made a disappointing start to his grand slam comeback, losing in straight sets to Radek Štěpánek 6–3, 6–4, 6–1.
 Seeds out:
Men's Singles:  Ivo Karlović
Women's Singles:  Amélie Mauresmo,  Kaia Kanepi
Schedule of Play

Day 2 (May 25)
World number one and top seed Dinara Safina thrashed British Number one Anne Keothavong, 6–0, 6–0 in the first match on Philippe Chatrier, followed by ATP World Tour Champion and four-time defending champion, top seed Rafael Nadal defeating Brazilian qualifier Marcos Daniel 7–5, 6–4, 6–3. Second seed Roger Federer followed with a comfortable victory over Alberto Martín 6–4, 6–3, 6–2. Third seed Venus Williams struggled against Bethanie Mattek-Sands, but won 6–1, 4–6, 6–2. French wildcard Guillaume Rufin, who turned 19 on day 3, upset Eduardo Schwank, who reached the second week last year, 6–1, 6–3, 6–3 to the delight of French fans. However, fans were disappointed to see their Nicolas Devilder fall in five sets (despite holding a two sets to love lead) to seventeenth seed Stanislas Wawrinka, 6–3, 5–7, 2–6, 6–4, 6–4. More disappointment came when Romain Jouan, another wildcard, fell 6–2, 6–4, 6–2 to sixth seed Andy Roddick. However, more good news for American fans followed when Fed Cup heroine Alexa Glatch stunned Flavia Pennetta 6–1, 6–1, to advance to the second round. Kateryna Bondarenko upset Patty Schnyder, and 13th seed Marion Bartoli recovered in an all-French affair to beat Pauline Parmentier 3–6, 6–1, 6–3. Two more French wild cards fell as Uzbekistan's Akgul Amanmuradova defeated Irena Pavlovic and Australian Jarmila Groth beat Kinnie Laisné. Seeds Nikolay Davydenko, Robin Söderling, and Zheng Jie also advanced. Another of the day's upsets came at the hands Colombia's Mariana Duque Mariño, who beat former Top 5 player and 26th seeded Russia's Anna Chakvetadze, winning 3–6, 6–4, 6–4.
Seeds out:
Men's Singles:  Tomáš Berdych
Women's Singles:  Alisa Kleybanova,  Flavia Pennetta,  Patty Schnyder,  Anna Chakvetadze
Schedule of Play

Day 3 (May 26)
Serbs Jelena Janković and Novak Djokovic had no problems in their first round matches, beating Petra Cetkovská and Nicolás Lapentti respectively. Serena Williams came through a tough tie – in which she squandered eight match points – against Czech Klára Zakopalová to win 6–3, 6–7(5), 6–4. All French seeds came through unscathed with victories for Marion Bartoli, Jo-Wilfried Tsonga, Paul-Henri Mathieu and Gaël Monfils. The United States' hopes of having a French Open champion took a big blow as James Blake and Mardy Fish both lost to Argentinian opponents. Fish lost to Máximo González 6–3, 1–6, 6–4, 7–6(4), and Blake, the highest seed to fall on Day 3, was beaten convincingly by Argentinian qualifier Leonardo Mayer 7–6(6), 7–5, 6–2. Number 27 seed Rainer Schüttler was comprehensively beaten by home favourite Marc Gicquel 6–0, 6–0, 6–4 and Chinese number 31 seed Peng Shuai was the only women's seed to go out, as she lost to Spain's María José Martínez Sánchez 1–6, 6–2, 6–4. There were victories for 10th seeded Dane Caroline Wozniacki, former finalist Svetlana Kuznetsova, Olympic gold medallist Elena Dementieva and World No. 5 Juan Martín del Potro.
Seeds out:
Men's Singles:  Rainer Schüttler,  Mardy Fish,  James Blake
Women's Singles:  Peng Shuai
Schedule of Play

Day 4 (May 27)
Day 4 saw the start of the second round matches in both the men's and women's draws. The first match up on Court Philippe Chatrier was world number 3 Andy Murray, who he faced Italian world number 104 Potito Starace. Murray was made to work hard, as Starace took control of the tie and levelled the match at one set all. At 5–1 in the third set, Murray worked his way back to reel of 6 games in a row, and went on the win 6–3, 2–6, 7–5, 6–4. World number 1 Dinara Safina was first up on Court Suzanne Lenglen, and made light work of Vitalia Diatchenko, winning 6–1, 6–1. Defending women's champion Ana Ivanovic also won comprehensively, beating Tamarine Tanasugarn to enter the third round. French tennis fans had reason to cheer as number 15 seed Alizé Cornet resumed her match from day 3, and beat Maret Ani 6–4, 7–5 to advance to the second round. Another Frenchwoman, Aravane Rezaï beat Slovenian qualifier Polona Hercog to book a tie with Portuguese qualifier Michelle Larcher de Brito in the third round, who beat number 15 seed Zheng Jie earlier in the day. Unseeded Maria Sharapova faced number 11 seed Nadia Petrova in her first match against a top 20 player since her 10-month absence from the tour due to injury. A gutsy Sharapova came through with a 3 sets victory, 8–6 in the third. Gilles Simon was the only seeded Frenchman playing on day 4, and made swift work of American Robert Kendrick 7–5, 6–0, 6–1. Defending champion Rafael Nadal made history by becoming the first person to win 30 consecutive matches at Roland Garros by beating Teymuraz Gabashvili. French wildcard Josselin Ouanna caused perhaps the biggest upset of the day by beating number 20 seed Marat Safin in an epic five set match, in which he won the final set 10–8.
Seeds out:
Men's Singles:  Dmitry Tursunov,  Feliciano López,  Marat Safin
Women's Singles:  Zheng Jie,  Nadia Petrova

The first matches of the doubles competition were played, with World No. 1 team Liezel Huber and Cara Black, Květa Peschke and Lisa Raymond, defending champions Anabel Medina Garrigues and Virginia Ruano Pascual, and Samantha Stosur and Rennae Stubbs were amongst the first to advance to the second round of the women's doubles.

On the men's side, defending champions Pablo Cuevas and Luis Horna, Lukáš Dlouhý and Leander Paes, Bruno Soares and Kevin Ullyett, and Mariusz Fyrstenberg and Marcin Matkowski all advanced to the second round. However, number 7 seeds Andy Ram and Max Mirnyi and number 10 seeds Marcelo Melo and André Sá suffered shock first-round defeats.
Seeds out:
Men's Doubles:  Stephen Huss /  Ross Hutchins,  Marcelo Melo /  André Sá,  Max Mirnyi /  Andy Ram,  Martin Damm /  Robert Lindstedt
Women's Doubles:  Nuria Llagostera Vives /  María José Martínez Sánchez,  Nathalie Dechy /  Mara Santangelo
Schedule of play

Day 5 (May 28)
Day 5 got off to a slow start from a French perspective, as number 13 seed and home favourite Marion Bartoli succumbed to Tathiana Garbin of Italy in straight sets on Court Philippe Chatrier. And the day got worse for France as number 21 seed Alizé Cornet could not find her way past Romanian teenager Sorana Cîrstea. However, they did have some consolation, as Virginie Razzano navigated her way past Anabel Medina Garrigues, and booked a place in the third round to play Bartoli conqueror Garbin. On Court Suzanne Lenglen, Serb Jelena Janković had little problem in seeing off Slovakian opponent Magdaléna Rybáriková, 6–1, 6–2. Venus Williams was made to work very hard to make the third round, as she went the distance with Lucie Šafářová, narrowly winning the final set 7–5. There were also victories for Elena Dementieva, Agnieszka Radwańska, former finalist Svetlana Kuznetsova and 2002 champion Serena Williams.

Meanwhile, in the men's draw, Roger Federer was first up on Court Philippe Chatrier as he faced clay court specialist José Acasuso. Roger narrowly won the first set 7–6(8) in a first set tie-break, but Acasuso was not ready to falter, and came back stronger in the second set and eventually winning 7–5. Acasuso continued to put up strong resistance and took Federer to a third set tie-break, however Federer was too strong and won, from thereon Federer had little problem dispatching Acasuso winning the match 7–6(8), 5–7, 7–6(2), 6–2. Federer's victory set him up with a third round tie with Frenchman Paul-Henri Mathieu. After disappointed from the French ladies, the men did not disappoint. Jo-Wilfried Tsonga, Gaël Monfils and Jérémy Chardy and Marc Gicquel all advanced to the third round. No seeds were knocked out, as there were victories from number 5 seed Juan Martín del Potro, Andy Roddick and Tommy Robredo, Philipp Kohlschreiber and Igor Andreev and Jürgen Melzer.
Seeds out:
Women's Singles:  Marion Bartoli,  Sybille Bammer,  Alizé Cornet,  Anabel Medina Garrigues
There was only one shocking exit from the men's doubles on the day, as Jeff Coetzee and Jordan Kerr were knocked out by the hands of Jaroslav Levinský and Igor Zelenay. Bob and Mike Bryan, Daniel Nestor and Nenad Zimonjić, Rik de Voest and Ashley Fisher, and Łukasz Kubot and Oliver Marach all secured places in the second round of the doubles.

There no upsets in the women's doubles, as all seeds made safe progress through to the second round including Serena and Venus Williams, and Květa Peschke and Lisa Raymond.

On day 5, the mixed doubles got under way, which saw just one upset. Nenad Zimonjić and Yan Zi fell to the hands of Bruno Soares and Alisa Kleybanova. Cara Black and Leander Paes, Lisa Raymond and Marcin Matkowski, Nadia Petrova and Max Mirnyi, and Elena Vesnina and Daniel Nestor all advanced to the second round.
Seeds out:
Men's Doubles:  Jeff Coetzee /  Jordan Kerr
Mixed Doubles:  Nenad Zimonjić /  Yan Zi
Schedule of play

Day 6 (May 29)
There were mixed French fortunes on Day 6. Aravane Rezaï beat Michelle Larcher de Brito to move into the fourth round. The newest French star, Josselin Ouanna, saw his run come to an end at the hands of 12th seeded Chilean Fernando González, 7–5, 6–3, 7–5. Following that, Gilles Simon, seeded 7th, suffered a collapse to 30th seed Victor Hănescu 6–4, 6–4, 6–2. Rafael Nadal, the four-time defending champion and World Number 1, looked in stellar form as he continued his undefeated run against Lleyton Hewitt, a former holder of the top ranking, 6–1, 6–3, 6–1. Stanislas Wawrinka was eliminated in four sets by tenth seeded Nikolay Davydenko, whilst Fernando Verdasco beat countryman Nicolás Almagro and Robin Söderling, the 23rd seed, set up a clash with Nadal by beating David Ferrer in four sets. Ágnes Szávay stunned third seed Venus Williams 6–0, 6–4, and Novak Djokovic beat Sergiy Stakhovsky. Additionally, defending champion Ana Ivanovic, Đoković's compatriot, advanced convincingly over Iveta Benešová, seeded 32nd, 6–0, 6–2. Andy Murray led Janko Tipsarević two sets to love before the Serb retired.
Seeds out:
Men's Singles:  Nicolás Almagro,  Stanislas Wawrinka,  Radek Štěpánek,  Gilles Simon,  David Ferrer
Women's Singles:  Iveta Benešová,  Venus Williams,  Anastasia Pavlyuchenkova
Men's Doubles:  Travis Parrott /  Filip Polášek,  František Čermák /  Michal Mertiňák,  Mariusz Fyrstenberg /  Marcin Matkowski,  Łukasz Kubot /  Oliver Marach
Women's Doubles:  Chuang Chia-jung /  Sania Mirza
Mixed Doubles:  Stephen Huss /  Virginia Ruano Pascual
Schedule of play

Day 7 (May 30)
Seeds out:
Men's Singles:  Jürgen Melzer,  Novak Djokovic,  Paul-Henri Mathieu
Women's Singles:  Elena Dementieva,  Carla Suárez Navarro,  Caroline Wozniacki
Men's Doubles:  Pablo Cuevas /  Luis Horna
Women's Doubles:  Daniela Hantuchová /  Ai Sugiyama,  Maria Kirilenko /  Flavia Pennetta,  Vania King /  Monica Niculescu
Mixed Doubles:  Leander Paes /  Cara Black
Schedule of play

Day 8 (May 31)
Day 8 saw Rafael Nadal lose his first ever match at French Open to Swede Robin Söderling, which ended his streak of 31 wins in a row at Roland Garros. Also out was defending women's champion Ana Ivanovic. Former world number 1 Maria Sharapova continued her miraculous run by defeating Li Na 6–4, 0–6, 6–4 to reach the quarterfinals, after returning from nine months away from the game. Nikolay Davydenko beat Fernando Verdasco to advance to the quarters with Söderling. Fernando González beat Victor Hănescu in straight sets to set up a quarterfinal with number four Andy Murray, a winner over Marin Čilić in tight but straight sets. World Number 1 Dinara Safina continued her dominant run of losing just 5 games all tournament against Aravane Rezaï, winning 6–1, 6–0.
Seeds out:
Men's Singles:  Victor Hănescu,  Marin Čilić,  Rafael Nadal,  Fernando Verdasco
Women's Singles:  Ágnes Szávay,  Ana Ivanovic,  Li Na
Men's Doubles:  Rik de Voest /  Ashley Fisher,  Mahesh Bhupathi /  Mark Knowles
Women's Doubles:  Samantha Stosur /  Rennae Stubbs,  Květa Peschke /  Lisa Raymond,  Venus Williams /  Serena Williams
Mixed Doubles:  Daniel Nestor /  Elena Vesnina
Schedule of play

Day 9 (June 1)
Seeds out:
Men's Singles:  Philipp Kohlschreiber,  Jo-Wilfried Tsonga,  Andy Roddick
Women's Singles:  Aleksandra Wozniak,  Agnieszka Radwańska,  Jelena Janković
Men's Doubles:  Bruno Soares /  Kevin Ullyett
Women's Doubles:  Yan Zi /  Zheng Jie,  Anna-Lena Grönefeld /  Patty Schnyder
Mixed Doubles:  André Sá /  Ai Sugiyama,  Marcin Matkowski /  Lisa Raymond
Schedule of play

Day 10 (June 2)
Seeds out:
Men's Singles:  Nikolay Davydenko,  Andy Murray
Women's Singles:  Victoria Azarenka
Women's Doubles:  Bethanie Mattek-Sands /  Nadia Petrova
Schedule of play

Day 11 (June 3)
Seeds out:
Men's Singles:  Gaël Monfils,  Tommy Robredo
Women's Singles:  Serena Williams
Women's Doubles:  Cara Black /  Liezel Huber,  Su-wei Hsieh /  Peng Shuai
Mixed Doubles:  Nadia Petrova /  Max Mirnyi
Schedule of play

Day 12 (June 4)
Seeds out:
Women's Singles:  Dominika Cibulková,  Samantha Stosur
Men's Doubles:  Bob Bryan /  Mike Bryan,  Daniel Nestor /  Nenad Zimonjić
Schedule of play

Day 13 (June 5)
Seeds out:
Men's Singles:  Fernando González,  Juan Martín del Potro
Women's Doubles:  Victoria Azarenka /  Elena Vesnina
Schedule of play

Day 14 (June 6)
Seeds out:
Women's Singles:  Dinara Safina
Schedule of play

Day 15 (June 7)
The men's singles final was briefly interrupted as Jimmy Jump carrying a FC Barcelona banner ran onto the court during the second set, running around Roger Federer and even putting a cap on him, then jumping over the net before being taken out by security. This is the first time this has ever happened at the French Open, however the occurrence did not seem to throw off Federer, as he won the set, and eventually the match. Federer also completed a career Grand Slam and tied Pete Sampras's record of 14 Grand Slam titles after winning the French Open.
Seeds out:
Men's Singles:  Robin Söderling

Schedule of play

Finals

Men's singles

 Roger Federer defeated  Robin Söderling, 6–1, 7–6(1), 6–4
It was Federer's 2nd title of the year, and his 59th overall. It was his 14th career Grand Slam title (tying the all-time record set by Pete Sampras) and his 1st French Open title. In winning the French Open, Federer completed the career grand slam.

Women's singles

 Svetlana Kuznetsova defeated  Dinara Safina, 6–4, 6–2
It was Kuznetsova's 2nd title of the year, and her 11th overall. It was her 2nd career Grand Slam title, and her 1st French Open title.

Men's doubles

 Lukáš Dlouhý /  Leander Paes defeated  Wesley Moodie /  Dick Norman, 3–6, 6–3, 6–2
It was Dlouhý's 1st career Grand Slam title.
It was Paes' 5th career Grand Slam title, and his 2nd at the French Open.

Women's doubles

 Anabel Medina /  Virginia Ruano Pascual defeated  Victoria Azarenka /  Elena Vesnina, 6–1, 6–1
It was Medina's 2nd career Grand Slam title, and her 2nd (consecutive) at the French Open.
It was Ruano Pascual's 10th career Grand Slam title, and her 6th at the French Open.

Mixed doubles

 Liezel Huber /  Bob Bryan defeated  Vania King /  Marcelo Melo, 5–7, 7–6(5), 10–7

Juniors

Boys' singles

 Daniel Berta defeated  Gianni Mina, 6–1, 3–6, 6–3

Girls' singles

 Kristina Mladenovic defeated  Daria Gavrilova, 6–3, 6–2

Boys' doubles

 Marin Draganja /  Dino Marcan defeated  Guilherme Clezar /  Huang Liang-chi, 6–3, 6–2

Girls' doubles

 Elena Bogdan /  Noppawan Lertcheewakarn defeated  Tímea Babos /  Heather Watson, 3–6, 6–3, 10–8

Other events

Legends under 45 doubles

 Paul Haarhuis /  Cédric Pioline defeated  Pat Cash /  Emilio Sánchez, 6–3, 6–4

Legends over 45 doubles

 Anders Järryd /  John McEnroe defeated  Mansour Bahrami /  Henri Leconte, 7–6(2), 6–1

Wheelchair men's singles

 Shingo Kunieda defeated  Stéphane Houdet, 6–3, 3–6, 6–3

Wheelchair women's singles

 Esther Vergeer defeated  Korie Homan, 6–2, 7–5

Wheelchair men's doubles

 Stéphane Houdet /  Michaël Jérémiasz defeated  Robin Ammerlaan /  Maikel Scheffers, 6–2, 7–5

Wheelchair women's doubles

 Korie Homan /  Esther Vergeer defeated  Annick Sevenans /  Aniek van Koot, 6–2, 6–3

Seeds
Withdrawals: David Nalbandian, Richard Gasquet, Katarina Srebotnik, Vera Zvonareva.

Men's singles
 Rafael Nadal (fourth round, lost to Robin Söderling)
 Roger Federer (champion)
 Andy Murray (quarterfinals, lost to Fernando González)
 Novak Djokovic (third round, lost to Philipp Kohlschreiber)
 Juan Martín del Potro (semifinals, lost to Roger Federer)
 Andy Roddick (fourth round, lost to Gaël Monfils)
 Gilles Simon (third round, lost to Victor Hănescu)
 Fernando Verdasco (fourth round, lost to Nikolay Davydenko)
 Jo-Wilfried Tsonga (fourth round, lost to Juan Martín del Potro)
 Nikolay Davydenko  (quarterfinals, lost to Robin Söderling)
 Gaël Monfils (quarterfinals, lost to Roger Federer)
 Fernando González (semifinals, lost to Robin Söderling)
 Marin Čilić (fourth round, lost to Andy Murray)
 David Ferrer (third round, lost to Robin Söderling)
 James Blake (first round, lost to Leonardo Mayer)
 Tommy Robredo (fourth round, lost to Juan Martín del Potro)
 Stanislas Wawrinka (third round, lost to Nikolay Davydenko)
 Radek Štěpánek (third round, lost to Marin Čilić)
 Tomáš Berdych (first round, lost to Simone Bolelli)
 Marat Safin (second round, lost to Josselin Ouanna)
 Dmitry Tursunov (first round, lost to Arnaud Clément)
 Mardy Fish (first round, lost to Máximo González)
 Robin Söderling (final, lost to Roger Federer)
 Jürgen Melzer (third round, lost to Gaël Monfils)
 Igor Andreev (third round, lost to Juan Martín del Potro)
 Ivo Karlović (first round, lost to Lleyton Hewitt)
 Rainer Schüttler (first round, lost to Marc Gicquel)
 Feliciano López (second round, lost to Janko Tipsarević)
 Philipp Kohlschreiber (fourth round, lost to Tommy Robredo)
 Victor Hănescu (fourth round, lost to Fernando González)
 Nicolás Almagro (third round, lost to Fernando Verdasco)
 Paul-Henri Mathieu (third round, lost to Roger Federer)

Women's singles
 Dinara Safina (final, lost to Svetlana Kuznetsova)
 Serena Williams (quarterfinals, lost to Svetlana Kuznetsova)
 Venus Williams (third round, lost to Ágnes Szávay)
 Elena Dementieva (third round, lost to Samantha Stosur)
 Jelena Janković (fourth round, lost to Sorana Cîrstea)
 Vera Zvonareva (withdrew due to ankle injury)
 Svetlana Kuznetsova (champion)
 Ana Ivanovic (fourth round, lost to Victoria Azarenka)
 Victoria Azarenka (quarterfinals, lost to Dinara Safina)
 Caroline Wozniacki (third round, lost to Sorana Cîrstea)
 Nadia Petrova (second round, lost to Maria Sharapova)
 Agnieszka Radwańska (fourth round, lost to Svetlana Kuznetsova)
 Marion Bartoli (second round, lost to Tathiana Garbin)
 Flavia Pennetta (first round, lost to Alexa Glatch)
 Zheng Jie (second round, lost to Michelle Larcher de Brito)
 Amélie Mauresmo (first round, lost to Anna-Lena Grönefeld)
 Patty Schnyder (first round, lost to Kateryna Bondarenko)
 Anabel Medina Garrigues (second round, lost to Virginie Razzano)
 Kaia Kanepi (first round, lost to Yaroslava Shvedova)
 Dominika Cibulková (semifinals, lost to Dinara Safina)
 Alizé Cornet (second round, lost to Sorana Cîrstea)
 Carla Suárez Navarro (third round, lost to Victoria Azarenka)
 Alisa Kleybanova (first round, lost to Polona Hercog)
 Aleksandra Wozniak (fourth round, lost to Serena Williams)
 Li Na (fourth round, lost to Maria Sharapova)
 Anna Chakvetadze (first round, lost to Mariana Duque Mariño)
 Anastasia Pavlyuchenkova (third round, lost to Dinara Safina)
 Sybille Bammer (second round, lost to Melinda Czink)
 Ágnes Szávay (fourth round, lost to Dominika Cibulková)
 Samantha Stosur (semifinals, lost to Svetlana Kuznetsova)
 Peng Shuai (first round, lost to María José Martínez Sánchez)
 Iveta Benešová (third round, lost to Ana Ivanovic)

Wildcard entries
Below are the lists of the wildcard awardees entering in the main draws.

Men's singles wildcard entries
  Gastón Gaudio
  Romain Jouan
  Adrian Mannarino
  Josselin Ouanna
  Laurent Recouderc
  Guillaume Rufin
  Alexandre Sidorenko
  Bernard Tomic

Women's singles wildcard entries
  Lauren Embree
  Claire Feuerstein
  Kinnie Laisné
  Émilie Loit
  Kristina Mladenovic
  Irena Pavlovic
  Olivia Rogowska
  Olivia Sanchez

Men's doubles wildcard entries
  Julien Benneteau /  Nicolas Mahut
  Sébastien de Chaunac /  Benoît Paire
  Sébastien Grosjean /  Nicolás Lapentti
  Jérôme Haehnel /  Florent Serra
  Michaël Llodra /  Fabrice Santoro
  Mathieu Montcourt /  Édouard Roger-Vasselin
  Josselin Ouanna /  Jo-Wilfried Tsonga

Women's doubles wildcard entries
  Dominika Cibulková /  Virginie Razzano
  Stéphanie Foretz /  Camille Pin
  Violette Huck /  Laura Thorpe
  Viktoriya Kutuzova /  Aravane Rezaï
  Kinnie Laisné /  Stéphanie Vongsouthi
  Sophie Lefèvre /  Aurélie Védy
  Émilie Loit /  Kristina Mladenovic

Mixed doubles wildcard entries
  Séverine Brémond Beltrame /  Robert Lindstedt
  Stéphanie Cohen-Aloro /  Thierry Ascione
  Julie Coin /  Nicolas Mahut
  Pauline Parmentier /  Marc Gicquel
  Camille Pin /  Gilles Simon (withdrew)
  Aurélie Védy /  Josselin Ouanna

Qualifiers entries

Men's singles

  Fabio Fognini
  Leonardo Mayer
  Marcos Daniel
  Victor Crivoi
  Ilija Bozoljac
  Daniel Brands
  Jean-René Lisnard
  Santiago Giraldo
  Sergiy Stakhovsky
  Simon Greul
  Peter Polansky
  Franco Ferreiro
  Łukasz Kubot
  Santiago Ventura
  Jiří Vaněk
  Rui Machado

Lucky losers
  Thiago Alves
  Mathieu Montcourt

Women's singles

  Yaroslava Shvedova
  Zuzana Ondrášková
  Anastasija Sevastova
  Polona Hercog
  Chanelle Scheepers
  Vitalia Diatchenko
  Michelle Larcher de Brito
  Arantxa Rus
  Corinna Dentoni
  Yvonne Meusburger
  Petra Martić
  Carly Gullickson

Lucky losers
  Katie O'Brien
  Mariana Duque Mariño

Protected ranking
The following players have been accepted directly into the main draw using a protected ranking:

 Men's Singles
  Juan Ignacio Chela
  Stefan Koubek
  Andrei Pavel

 Women's Singles
  María Emilia Salerni

Withdrawals 

Men's Singles
  Mario Ančić → replaced by  Mathieu Montcourt
  Richard Gasquet → replaced by  Andrey Golubev
  Carlos Moyá → replaced by  Steve Darcis
  David Nalbandian → replaced by  Daniel Köllerer
  Jarkko Nieminen → replaced by  Kevin Kim
  Kei Nishikori → replaced by  Brian Dabul
  Björn Phau → replaced by  Thiago Alves

Women's Singles
  Chan Yung-jan → replaced by  Marta Domachowska
  Casey Dellacqua → replaced by  Raluca Olaru
  Marina Erakovic → replaced by  Melanie South
  Petra Kvitová → replaced by  Mariana Duque Mariño
  Shahar Pe'er → replaced by  Alexa Glatch
  Meghann Shaughnessy → replaced by  Mara Santangelo
  Katarina Srebotnik → replaced by  Varvara Lepchenko
  Vera Zvonareva → replaced by  Katie O'Brien

Media coverage
In the US, coverage was provided by The Tennis Channel. In France, the French Open is broadcast live by France Télévisions and Eurosport. In the UK and Republic of Ireland it is broadcast live by BBC and Eurosport, Irish viewers can also watch live on TG4. In Switzerland it is broadcast live by SF, Radiotelevisione svizzera di lingua italiana and Télévision Suisse Romande. In Serbia, it is broadcast live by RTS and Eurosport. In Sweden (Robin Söderling's home country), it is broadcast live by Eurosport and SVT also broadcast the men's final live.

References

External links

Official website

 
2009 WTA Tour
2009 in French tennis
2009 ATP World Tour
2009 in Paris
May 2009 sports events in France
June 2009 sports events in France